Clay County (county code CY) is a county located in the U.S. state of Kansas. As of the 2020 census, the county population was 8,117. Its county seat and most populous city is Clay Center.

History

Early history

For many millennia, the Great Plains of North America was inhabited by nomadic Native Americans.  From the 16th century to 18th century, the Kingdom of France claimed ownership of large parts of North America.  In 1762, after the French and Indian War, France secretly ceded New France to Spain, per the Treaty of Fontainebleau.

19th century
In 1802, Spain returned most of the land to France, but keeping title to about 7,500 square miles.  In 1803, most of the land for modern day Kansas was acquired by the United States from France as part of the 828,000 square mile Louisiana Purchase for 2.83 cents per acre.

In 1854, the Kansas Territory was organized, then in 1861 Kansas became the 34th U.S. state.  In 1857, Clay County was established.

When the first counties were created by the Kansas legislature in 1855, the territory within the present limits of the county was attached to Riley County for all revenue and judicial purposes.  Subsequently, Clay was attached to Geary County. In 1857, Clay was created and named in honor of the famous American statesman Henry Clay, a member of the United States Senate from Kentucky and United States Secretary of State in the 19th century.

In 1887, the Atchison, Topeka and Santa Fe Railway built a branch line from Neva (3 miles west of Strong City) to Superior, Nebraska.  This branch line connected Strong City, Neva, Rockland, Diamond Springs, Burdick, Lost Springs, Jacobs, Hope, Navarre, Enterprise, Abilene, Talmage, Manchester, Longford, Oak Hill, Miltonvale, Aurora, Huscher, Concordia, Kackley, Courtland, Webber, Superior. At some point, the line from Neva to Lost Springs was pulled, but the right of way has not been abandoned. This branch line was originally called "Strong City and Superior line" but later the name was shortened to the "Strong City line". In 1996, the Atchison, Topeka and Santa Fe Railway merged with Burlington Northern Railroad and renamed to the current BNSF Railway. Most locals still refer to this railroad as the "Santa Fe".

21st century
In 2010, the Keystone-Cushing Pipeline (Phase II) was constructed north to south through Clay County, with much controversy over tax exemption and environmental concerns (if a leak ever occurs). A pumping station named Riley was built along the pipeline.

Geography

Adjacent counties
 Washington County (north)
 Riley County (east)
 Geary County (southeast)
 Dickinson County (south)
 Ottawa County (southwest)
 Cloud County (west)

Major highways
Sources:  National Atlas, U.S. Census Bureau
 U.S. Route 24
 Kansas Highway 15
 Kansas Highway 82

Demographics

 

As of the 2000 census, there were 8,822 people, 3,617 households, and 2,517 families residing in the county.  The population density was 14 people per square mile (5/km2).  There were 4,084 housing units at an average density of 6 per square mile (2/km2).  The racial makeup of the county was 97.72% White, 0.57% Black or African American, 0.41% Native American, 0.15% Asian, 0.26% from other races, and 0.90% from two or more races. Hispanic or Latino people of any race were 0.83% of the population.

There were 3,617 households, out of which 30.50% had children under the age of 18 living with them, 59.90% were married couples living together, 6.10% had a female householder with no husband present, and 30.40% were non-families. 27.70% of all households were made up of individuals, and 15.40% had someone living alone who was 65 years of age or older.  The average household size was 2.39 and the average family size was 2.91.

In the county, the population was spread out, with 24.90% under the age of 18, 6.70% from 18 to 24, 23.90% from 25 to 44, 23.70% from 45 to 64, and 20.80% who were 65 years of age or older.  The median age was 41 years. For every 100 females there were 99.10 males.  For every 100 females age 18 and over, there were 95.60 males.

The median income for a household in the county was $33,965, and the median income for a family was $41,103. Males had a median income of $28,817 versus $17,760 for females. The per capita income for the county was $17,939.  About 6.80% of families and 10.10% of the population were below the poverty line, including 14.60% of those under age 18 and 8.60% of those age 65 or over.

Government

Presidential elections

Like all of Kansas outside the eastern cities, Clay County is overwhelmingly Republican. When Lyndon B. Johnson became in 1964 the last Democrat to carry the state's electoral votes, Clay County was his weakest in the state, giving over 62 percent of its votes to Barry Goldwater. The solitary Democrat to win a majority of Clay County's votes has been William Jennings Bryan in 1896, although Woodrow Wilson in a four-way race in 1912, and Franklin D. Roosevelt in 1932 both obtained slim pluralities. Roosevelt in 1936, when he lost to Kansan Alf Landon by eighty-four votes, remains the last Democrat to win forty percent of the county's vote, and Jimmy Carter in 1976 is the last to pass thirty percent.

Education

Unified school districts that serve portions of the county include:
 Clay County USD 379
 Clifton-Clyde USD 224
 Southern Cloud USD 334

Communities

Cities

 Clay Center
 Wakefield
 Clifton (partly in Washington County)
 Morganville
 Green
 Longford
 Vining (partly in Washington County)
 Oak Hill

Unincorporated communities
† means a Census-Designated Place (CDP) by the United States Census Bureau.
 Idana†
 Industry (partly)
 Ladysmith

Ghost towns
 Broughton
 Browndale

Townships
Clay County is divided into eighteen townships.  The city of Clay Center is considered governmentally independent and is excluded from the census figures for the townships.  In the following table, the population center is the largest city (or cities) included in that township's population total, if it is of a significant size.

Notable people
See List of people from Clay County, Kansas

Two former Kansas Governors resided in Clay County.  George Docking was the 35th Governor, serving from January 14, 1957, until January 9, 1961.  William H. Avery was the 37th Governor, from January 11, 1965, until January 9, 1967.

See also
 Dry counties

References

Notes

Further reading

 Standard Atlas of Clay County, Kansas; Geo. A. Ogle & Co; 71 pages; 1918.
 Standard Atlas of Clay County, Kansas; Geo. A. Ogle & Co; 65 pages; 1900.
 Historical Plat Book of Clay County, Kansas; Bird & Mickle Map Co; 88 pages; 1881.

External links

County
 
 Clay County - Directory of Public Officials
Historical
 Clay County Kansas History and Heritage Project
Maps
 Clay County Maps: Current, Historic, KDOT
 Kansas Highway Maps: Current, Historic, KDOT
 Kansas Railroad Maps: Current, 1996, 1915, KDOT and Kansas Historical Society
Clay County Mural Map

 
Kansas counties
1857 establishments in Kansas Territory
Populated places established in 1857